Silfaya, is a village in Aley District in the Mount Lebanon Governorate of Lebanon.

External links
Selfaya, Localiban 

Populated places in Aley District